Gerson von Bleichröder (22 December 1822 – 18 February 1893) was a Jewish German banker.

Bleichröder was born in Berlin. He was the eldest son of Samuel Bleichröder, who founded the banking firm of S. Bleichröder in 1803 in Berlin.  Gerson first joined the family business in 1839.  In 1855 upon the death of his father, Gerson became the head of the banking firm.  The bank maintained close contacts with the Rothschild family; the banking house of Bleichröder acted as a branch office in Berlin of the Rothschilds' bank.

Traditionally, the Rothschilds represented the banking interests of the Austrian-controlled  German Confederation in Europe.  In the conflict between the rapidly rising and expanding nation of Kingdom of Prussia and the "pro-Austrian" German Confederation, the Rothschild Bank was largely caught in an uncomfortable position in the middle of the conflict.

Meeting Bismarck
Since 1851, Otto von Bismarck had been serving as the Prussian ambassador to the German Confederation headquartered at Frankfurt-am-Main, a free city of the Confederation in what is now western Germany.  However, in March 1858, Bismarck was appointed ambassador to the Russian Empire.  In one of his last actions before leaving Frankfurt for St. Petersburg, Russia, Bismarck consulted Baron Mayer Carl von Rothschild for the name of a banker in Berlin to whom he could turn for personal as well as Prussian state business.  Just why Bismarck would turn to the Rothschild Bank to supply him with the name of a competing bank to whom Bismarck and the Prussian nation could turn may not be as hard to understand as first thought.  Everyone in Frankfurt knew that the Prussian nation would have to distance themselves from the Rothschild Bank given the Rothschilds' close diplomatic relations with Prussia's main rival—Austria-Hungary.  Yet neither Bismarck nor the Prussian nation wanted to burn their bridges and totally alienate the Rothschilds.  What better way to avoid this fissure with the Rothschilds than to ask the Rothschilds to provide the name of an alternative bank.

Rothschild gave the name of Gerson Bleichröder, who took over Bismarck's private banking transactions as well as the transfer of credits and/or placing of loans on behalf of the Prussian state and the German Empire. Thus, Bleichröder became intimately involved with not only Bismarck but also with the inner dynamics of the unification of Germany.

Unification of the German States
Over the decades since the life of Bismarck, it has become an article of faith among German historians that Bismarck, himself, was the agent most responsible for the unification of Germany under the Prussian throne.  This proposition, based on the "Great Man Theory" of history has been effectively challenged by recent historians.  Importantly, German economic historian Helmut Böhme argued that the Zollverein customs union of northern Germany, not Bismarck, was the most important agent in unifying Germany.

Consider the largely German-speaking territory in the middle of Europe at the end of the Napoleonic Era.  There was no single German state.  Rather there was a vast patchwork of small principalities, dukedoms and kingdoms.  As the largest and most powerful of the German-speaking states in middle Europe, the Austrian Empire assumed the role of leader of all the German-speaking states of middle Europe.  The Congress of Vienna in 1815 established the German Confederation which organized nearly all of the German-speaking states under the control of the dual authority of Austria and Prussia.  However, Prussia was clearly the weaker power in this dual authority within the German Confederation.  Economically, the Austrian Empire based itself on the landowning aristocracy.  This landowning aristocracy required the Austrian state to maintain high tariffs against the cheap imports of raw farm products.  This kept prices of food products within the Austrian Empire higher than in other areas of Europe.  Prussia, because of its location near the Baltic Sea was an up-and-coming power in Europe based on the new economy of trade, commerce and manufacturing.   As an economy based largely on trade, the Prussian economy thrived only when barriers to trade were reduced—barriers like high protective tariffs on imports from other countries.  Accordingly, Prussia united with other German states in 1818 to form a customs union—the Zollverein.  The states which joined the Zollverein were other German states who profited from trade and who thus favored low tariffs or even "free trade".  Generally, the states that joined the Zollverein were located in the northern part of the German-speaking region of Europe.  The Zollverein was a Prussian-dominated economic union of German-speaking states.

Because of the rising power of the Zollverein, Frederick William IV (1795-1861), king of Prussia from the death of his father in 1840  until 1861, began to entertain visions of a new political union of German states which would grow out of the Zollverein.  The Austrian-controlled German Confederation had been disbanded during the Revolution of 1848.  Frederick William IV's chief minister from April 25, 1849 until November 1850,  was General Joseph von Radowitz.   Radowitz now sought to establish a new Prussian-dominated union to replace the old German Confederation.  In October 1850, an agreement was made to have an assembly of all German states meet in the city of Erfurt, Germany to form this "Prussian Union."  At the time of the Erfurt Union, Bismarck did not have any use for the proposed union of German states under Prussian leadership.  Just why Bismarck of all people would refuse to support a unification in Germany under Prussian leadership in 1850 and just ten years later become the chief spokesman for just such a Prussian-led union of German states is curious, but as strong as the Zollverein was in 1850, the customs union, by 1860, had become much more influential over the economies of its members.

Between 1850 and 1860, the members of the Zollverein adopted a common currency, a common postal system and a common commercial code.  Later the Zollverein signed various reciprocal treaties with nations outside the customs union, culminating in the signing of a reciprocal treaty with France in 1862.  From this position of power, the Zollverein brought about the rapid industrialization of northern Germany and became a prime reason for Prussian involvement in the Second Schleswig-Holstein War of 1864.  As result of that war, two predominately German-speaking duchies, Schleswig and Holstein were ceded by Denmark and annexed by Prussia and Austria.  Another war, the Austro-Prussian War of 1866, and the dramatic military defeat of Austria at the Battle of Sadowa, resulted in both Schleswig and Holstein being ceded to Prussia alone.  Neither of these duchies had much in the way of mineral wealth or industry.  Even as late as the middle of the twentieth century, both duchies remained predominately rural with only 24% of the total population living in the main cities of Kiel ( 1950 pop. 218,335) and Lubeck (1950 pop. 133,021).  However, the duchies were to have a great impact on the industrialization of northern Germany because of their location and topography.  As early as 1784, a canal had been operating across the "neck" of the Jutland Peninsula on which Denmark is located.  This canal was known as the Eider Canal because it largely followed the winding Eider River across the Jutland Peninsula.  The Eider Canal saved a great deal of time and money in eliminating the need of ships to sail the long and dangerous way around the Jutland Peninsula to deliver cargo from the Baltic Sea to the North Sea or vice versa.  However, by 1860, shipping had gone from sail to steam and the Eider canal had been largely outdated.  Accordingly, rebuilding of the Eider Canal or construction of a new canal was drastically needed.  After the annexation of Schleswig by Prussia, the Prussian government set about improving the Eider Canal by building a new canal along a shorter, more direct route and by widening the canal to fit modern ships.  Commercial pressure encouraged the development of the new canal which, when completed in 1887, was named the Kaiser Willhelm Canal.  Indeed, the economic motivation behind the canal most probably was the main motivation for the war on Denmark in the first place.

The Schleswig-Holstein War of 1864 was the first of three wars which are credited with bringing about the unification of Germany into a single state under the authority of the Prussian crown.  The second war was the Austro-Prussian War of 1866 and the third and final war was the Franco-Prussian War of 1870.  In January 1871, a ceremony was held in Versailles which made William I of Prussia the German Emperor of the now unified German Empire.  This, then, is the background of the building of the German Empire against which the relationship of Gerson Bleichröder and Otto von Bismarck played itself out.

Banker for Bismarck and the Prussian State

Gerson Bleichröder served Bismarck at several crucial points during the period of time that Bismarck was the chief minister to the Prussian king.  As a result of the Schleswig War of 1864, Prussia and Austria, as joint victors in that war, were awarded the two German-speaking duchies of Schleswig and Holstein on August 1, 1864.   Prussia annexed the more northern duchy of Schleswig, while Austria was given annexation control over the more southern duchy of Holstein.  Austria did not share any border with the newly acquired duchies, but the duchy of Holstein was located between Schleswig to the north and Prussian-controlled territories to the south.  Austria sought to create difficulties for its up-and-coming rival—Prussia—by entertaining the idea of inviting the heir of the deposed House of Schleswig-Holstein-Sonderburg-Augustenburg—Duke Frederick VIII of Augustenburg—back to administer the Holstein duchy.  This solution was intolerable to Prussia because the Duke of Augustenburg was related to the royal family of Denmark.  The fear was that this would have brought Danish troops right back to same frontier that they had occupied prior to the war.  Furthermore, the Prussian-annexed Schleswig duchy (where the Prussian government was intending to upgrade the Kiel Canal) would be isolated from the rest of Prussian Germany.

Accordingly, a plan was developed for Prussia to purchase all Austrian "rights" to the duchies before any transfer of those rights could be made to Duke Frederick.  The deal had a good chance of succeeding because the Austria Empire was in financial trouble at the time. Gerson Bleichröder opened secret negotiations with Moritz Ritter von Goldschmidt to pay a large sum of money to Austria for any and all rights to the two duchies of Holstein and Schleswig.  In the end, the administration of Holstein was not settled until 1866, after the Austro-Prussian War.

Meanwhile, Bismarck still faced the problem of raising money to pay for the Schleswig-Holstein War.  To be sure, the victory in that war had brought glory to Bismarck and the Prussian nation.  However, the elected United Prussian Diet which had the authority to raise public funds to pay for the war was still dragging its feet about paying for the Schleswig War despite the glory to the Prussian nation. Furthermore, Bismarck as a monarchist had long detested elected parliaments of all kinds and he especially hated going "hat in hand" to the United Diet to beg for money.  Accordingly, Gerson Bleichröder developed several plans by which money could be raised without going to the United Diet.  For instance there was the Preussische Seenhandlung, a bank that had been founded by Frederick the Great in 1772, that still operated as an independent institute under the Prussian throne.  Money could be raised by the king independently of the Diet by either selling shares of the bank or by arranging a bond issue through the bank.  In the summer of 1865, the Rothschild Bank, working through Gerson Bleichröder, underwrote an entire public offering of bonds against the government shares of Seehandlung.

Furthermore, much of the railroad-building in Germany had been done with public funds.  In exchange for the public funds the government had taken part ownership in the railways.  Consequently, by 1860, the government had a large investment in all the railroads in Germany.  One of these railroads was the Cologne-Minden Railroad.  Gerson Bleichröder just happened be the banker for the Cologne-Minden Railroad and sat on the Board of Directors of the railroad.  Once again the government could sell its shares in this railroad or establish a loan with the government shares as collateral.   In the end the government shares in the Cologne-Minden Railroad were sold to raise money independently of the United Diet.

The spectacular victory of the Prussian Army at the battle of Sadowa (Könnigrätz), on July 3, 1866 during the Austro-Prussian War, changed the entire face of Europe.  Many of the small German states flocked to the banner of Prussia by joining the new Prussian-led North German Confederation which was formed in April 1867.  No longer merely an economic union like the Zollverein, the North German Confederation had a constitution and a democratically elected Reichstag based on universal popular  sovereignty.  Inside the North German Confederation, the German nation was completely integrated under Prussian rule.  However, the three large south-German states of Bavaria, Württemberg and Baden remained outside of the Confederation.  These German states hoped to remain independent of the Confederation and had looked to Austria for protection from forced absorption into the Prussian-dominated Confederation.  However, since the utter defeat of the Austrians at the battle of Sadowa, the three south-German states had begun to look to an alliance of Austria and France as their only protection.  Thus, war clouds rose again as Prussia began to see France as the major obstacle to unification of all Germany under the Prussian throne.  It has been a matter of dispute between recent German historians as to whether Bismarck wanted war with France or not.  Some historians feel that Bismarck was forced into a war he did not want.  Others view Bismarck as actively pushing war with France continuously from the time of the Battle of Sadowa.  The reason there are no clear historical records to resolve this conflict is that whatever Bismarck's views on war with France, he insisted on keeping his views very much private.  What contacts he had with France regarding the political situation were made in a furtive way.  Once again he turned to Gerson Bleichröder to handle these back-channel communications with the French government.  During July 1870, Bleichröder was in frequent contact with the Rothchilds in Paris—bankers to Napoleon III and the French government—to ascertain Napoleon's true intentions with regard to war.

As the chief banker for Bismarck and the Prussian state, Gerson Bleichröder was also in a position to help several influential German families in their hour of need.  In 1868, an ambitious 915-mile railroad project in Rumania, which would link the Rumanian capital, Bucharest, with all other major parts of the country, was touted to investors by financier Bethel Henry Strousberg.  However, in 1871, while construction of the railway was underway, the consortium headed by Strussberg went into bankruptcy.  In order to help a few prominent German families out of their rash and speculative investments in the Strussberg consortium, the entire Strussberg consortium was purchased out of bankruptcy by another consortium headed by Gerson Bleichröder and supported by Otto von Bismarck.  As a result, Gerson Bleichröder became an accepted part of even non-Jewish and often anti-Semitic German society.  He became a partner at the investment bank of Ladenburg Thalmann. Bleichröder and his family were made Prussian nobles on 8 March 1872, in Berlin. Bleichröder was only the second Jew in Prussia to be ennobled.  Bleichröder was preceded only by Abraham Oppenheim, another banker close to the regime, ennobled four years earlier.

The German-American historian Fritz Stern wrote a double-biography of Otto von Bismarck and Gerson von Bleichröder, Gold and Iron: Bismarck, Bleichröder, and the Building of the German Empire .

See also
Arnhold and S. Bleichroeder, an investment bank.

Notes

External links

Literature on an about Gerson Bleichröeder in the catalog of the DDB

 

1822 births
1893 deaths
Bleichröder family
19th-century German Jews
Court Jews
German bankers
German untitled nobility
Prussian nobility
Businesspeople from Berlin
People from the Province of Brandenburg
Burials at Schönhauser Allee Cemetery, Berlin
19th-century German businesspeople